Finance & Development is a quarterly journal published by the International Monetary Fund (the IMF). 

The journal publishes analysis on issues related to the financial system, monetary policy, economic development, poverty reduction, and other world economic issues.

Contributors
Contributors are both IMF staff and prominent international financial experts and finance academics. 

Print and web editions are published quarterly in English, Arabic, Chinese, French, Russian, and Spanish.

References

External links
Finance & Development

Quarterly magazines published in the United States
International Monetary Fund
Business magazines published in the United States
Magazines established in 1964
Multilingual magazines
Quarterly journals
Economics journals
Multilingual journals